Rashidabad (also Romanized as Rashīdābād; also known as Eleshtava and Yeleshtava) is a small village in Kaghazkonan-e Shomali Rural District, Kaghazkonan District, Meyaneh County, East Azerbaijan Province, Iran. At the 2006 census, its population was 101, in 36 families.

References 

Populated places in Meyaneh County